Lars Gulpen (born 4 July 1993 in Nijswiller) is a Dutch former professional footballer who played as a midfielder for Fortuna Sittard in the Dutch Eerste Divisie.

External links
 Voetbal International profile 

1993 births
Living people
Dutch footballers
Fortuna Sittard players
Eerste Divisie players
People from Gulpen-Wittem
Association football midfielders
Footballers from Limburg (Netherlands)